Borba Gato is a metro station on Line 5 (Lilac) of the São Paulo Metro in the Santo Amaro district of São Paulo, Brazil.

References

São Paulo Metro stations
Railway stations opened in 2017